Harper Glacier is a glacier in Denali National Park and Preserve in the U.S. state of Alaska. From about  it falls between Pioneer Ridge and Karpe Ridge in the Great Icefall down to the Lower Icefall to become Muldrow Glacier. In 1913, the glacier was named by Hudson Stuck after Walter Harper, a Koyukon mountaineer and the first man to reach the summit of Denali.

See also
 List of glaciers

References

Glaciers of Alaska
Glaciers of Denali Borough, Alaska
Glaciers of Denali National Park and Preserve
Denali